Anatoly Nikolayevich Dokumentov (Russian: Анато́лий Никола́евич Докуме́нтов, (19 December 1937) is a Russian pianist and composer.

Biography
Dokumentov was born in Kostroma, USSR in doctor's family.
At the age of 5 he started learning the piano and at the age of 14 he entered the Central Musical School attached to Moscow Conservatory. He studied piano with Elena Petrovna Hoven (pupil of Alexander Borisovich Goldenweiser) and composition with professor Vissarion Yakovlevich Shebalin.

From 1956 to 1961 he studied at the Moscow Conservatory initially with assistant professor Alexander Adrianovitch Yegorov (pupil of Konstantin Igumnov), then from 1959 at the class of professor Lev Nikolayevich Oborin. After graduating from the Higher Master School at Moscow Conservatory he studied composition with professor Nesterov (pupil of Vissarion Yakovlevich Shebalin) at Nizhny Novgorod Conservatory.

In 1961 Dokumentov moved back to Kostroma, working as a composer, performer at Kostroma Philharmonic Society and as a piano teacher. He is currently a professor of Nekrasov Kostroma State University.

In 1997 he worked with famous Russian producer Nikita Mikhalkov on the movie “The Barber of Siberia” where he arranged music, conducted orchestra, played music, coached the actors for singing and even was filmed.

He married pianist Natalia Ananievna Seliverstova in 1965. They have two children.

Performances
Dokumentov started his career as a performer at the Malyj Zal of Moscow Conservatory at the age of 14 performing Partita C-minor by J.S.Bach.
He has performed in USSR, Russia, Sweden, Denmark and Australia and with artists of Bolshoi Theatre; under the guidance of conductor Yury Aranovich (Principal conductor of Stockholm orchestra).

Compositions
Dokumentov's music has been performed in USSR, Russia, Denmark, Sweden, Vatican City, Japan and Australia. Among other pieces there are:

Awards and recognitions
Honorary Artist of Russia
Medal for Honor, Labor and Valour
Laureate of two Russian competitions of pianists (one together with N.Seliverstova)
Winner of Honorary certificate of Tokyo International Competition of composers in 1997

External links
Anatoly Dokumentov - Mentone Piano School homepage

Bibliography
Historical Kosrtroma encyclopedia pp. 94–95.
Journal of Russian Union of Composers “Musycalnaya Academia” 2003 p. 104
Magazine “Musical Life” 1972 issue 15
Journal “Soviet Music” 1976 issue 6
Magazine “Soviet Union” 1979 issue 2
Elizabeth Ogonkova, essay “Pianist” in the book “Moi Neschastlivtsevy”
Newspaper “Frederikssund Avis” 15 October 1996, “Glow and Spirit”

1937 births
Russian classical pianists
Male classical pianists
Russian composers
Russian male composers
Living people
21st-century classical pianists
21st-century Russian male musicians